The Niger Delta swamp forests is a tropical moist forest ecoregion in southern Nigeria. It consists of freshwater swamp forests in the Niger Delta of the Niger River.  This swamp forest is the second largest in Africa, after the Congolian swamp forests.  Although there are large cities just outside the ecoregion, the area has been relatively isolated by the difficulty of building roads across the swamps, although this is changing with development of oil and logging industries.  Scientific surveys have only begun in recent years, and new species were being identified into the 1990s.

Location and description 
The Niger Delta swamp forests ecoregion covers a triangular territory at the mouth of the Niger River.  The southern edge is set back about 10 km from the Gulf of Guinea, buffered by the Central African mangroves ecoregion where the effects of salt water are more pronounced.  The western border of the ecoregion is formed along the Benin River, the northern tip is just north of the city of Aboh, and the eastern edge runs along the Imo River.  The city of Port Harcourt is in the southeast corner of the ecoregion.

The Niger Delta is built up from silt deposits from the Niger River.  The landscape is flat with meandering branches of the main river.  The soils of the delta vary by the shifting rivers and creeks, with sand and loam marking the remains of old levees, water-logged heavy clay in the backswamps behind the levees, and silty loam and clay on the higher ground.

Climate 
The climate of the ecoregion is Tropical monsoon climate (Köppen climate classification (Am)).  This climate is characterized by relatively even temperatures throughout the year (all months being greater than  average temperature), and a pronounced dry season.  The driest month has less than 60 mm of precipitation, but more than (100-(average/25) mm.  This climate is mid-way between a tropical rainforest and a tropical savannah. The rainy season runs from March-April to October.  Precipitation ranges from 2,500 mm/year in the north to 4,000 mm/year along the coast in the south.  Relative humidity is 90-100% for most of the year.

Flora and fauna 
Approximately 67% of the ecoregion is covered in closed forest, mostly broadleaf evergreen.  Another 13% is open forest, 8% herbaceous wetland, 5% urban or built up, 3% under agricultural cultivation, and the remainder permanent and seasonal water.  The abura (Hallea ledermannii) tree, formerly common, has mostly been logged out of the delta.  Common trees in the flood forest include Oil palm (Elaeis guineensis), Azobe tree (Lophira alata), African nutmeg (Pycnanthus angolensis), Ricinodendron heudelotii, Hallea ledermannii, Flatcrown tree (Albizia adianthifolia), Wild mango (Irvingia gabonensis), (Klainedoxa gabonensis), (Treculia africana), and species of (Ficus).

Protected areas 
While about 8% of the ecoregion is nominally under some form of administrative protection, most such territory is in forest reserves subject to heavy logging pressure.  A survey in 2006 identified the presence of the endangered Nigeria-Cameroon chimpanzee in the Edumanom Forest Reserve and Ologbo Forest Reserve in the region.

References

 
Afrotropical ecoregions
Ecoregions of Nigeria
Tropical and subtropical moist broadleaf forests